The Special Achievement Genie is a special award given irregularly by the Academy of Canadian Cinema and Television at the Genie Awards.  It is mainly a Lifetime Achievement Award but can also mark a career milestone.

List of past recipients
(1981)	Micheline Lanctôt For displaying her award-winning talents in both the French and English languages, as an actress, a writer, an animator and (most recently) as a director.
(1984) Norman McLaren - Academy Award and BAFTA winning short film maker.  Winner of 10 Canadian Film Awards (The predecessor to the Genie Awards) In recognition of his long, successful and internationally acclaimed career in the world of animation filmmaking.
(1985) Paul LeBlanc For his impressive body of work in film and television hairstyling
(1985) Ivan Reitman For his outstanding success with some of the biggest comedy hits of our generation.  The Academy singled out the films Animal House, Meatballs, Stripes and Ghostbusters.
(1986) Graeme Ferguson For his work with IMAX
(1987) Emil Radok, Paul Kravicky For the film Taming of the Demons which played primarily at Vancouver's Expo '86	
(1988) Norman Jewison - 7 time Academy Award nominated filmmaker. This award is given to Norman Jewison for founding and establishing the new Canadian Centre for Advanced Film Studies.
(1989) Presented to The National Film Board of Canada 
(1991) John Kemeny

Genie Awards
Canadian Screen Award film categories